Ponnuswami Sitaram (22 July 1932 – 12 September 1995) was an Indian cricketer born in Bangalore, who played for Delhi in the Ranji Trophy. A right arm medium pace bowler, Sitaram was an Indian Cricket Cricketer of the Year in 1963. He had also represented India on Tour to Pakistan in the 1950s. However, that was his only international stint for the Indian Team.

Post his retirement from first class cricket, he took up the job of a curator at a leading club in Delhi. From thereon he went on to develop cricket stadia and pitches across the Northern and Central parts of India including some famous venues like Gwalior and Delhi.

References 

1932 births
1995 deaths
Indian cricketers
Delhi cricketers
Services cricketers
North Zone cricketers
Cricketers from Bangalore